Arthur Paul could refer to: 

Arthur George Paul (1864–1942), Irish athlete
Arthur Forman Balfour Paul (1875–1938), Scottish architect
Art Paul (1925–2018), American graphic designer

See also
Paul Arthurs